Michele "Miky" Faccin (born January 19, 1990, in Padova) is a professional racing driver from Italy.

Career

Karting
Faccin began his motorsport career in karting back in 2002, and two years later finished fourth in the Italian Championship ICA Junior class. In 2005, he finished as runner-up in the same category whilst also competing in the Italian Open Masters and European Championship ICA Junior classes.

Formula Azzurra
In 2006, aged just sixteen years old, Faccin made his debut in single-seaters, racing in the Formula Azzurra series in his native Italy. He took four podium places in thirteen races, including one victory, to end the season in fifth place.

Formula Renault
Towards the end of 2006, Faccin graduated to Formula Renault, taking part in the Italian Formula Renault 2.0 Winter Series for  Motorsport. He once again finished fifth in the championship, behind Mirko Bortolotti and Jaime Alguersuari.

The following year, he contested a full season in the series, finishing in twentieth place. He also took part in the Swiss Formula Renault 2.0 championship. Despite missing the round at Varano, he finished fifth in the championship, taking race wins at Dijon and Most.

In 2008, Faccin took part in both the Italian Formula Renault 2.0 and Eurocup Formula Renault 2.0 championships, racing for the Jenzer Motorsport team. In the Italian series, he finished as runner-up to teammate Pål Varhaug, taking four podium places including race wins at Vallelunga and a double victory at Spa-Francorchamps. In the Eurocup, he finished in the points on seven occasions and despite not recording a top three finish, he was classified in ninth place in the standings.

Formula Three
2009 saw Faccin make the step up to Formula Three, racing in the newly named European F3 Open Championship for the Q8 Oils Hache Team. Racing in the secondary Copa de España class, for the previous generation Dallara F306 chassis, Faccin took part in ten of the first twelve races before missing the final four races of the season. He took four class podiums, including two at Donington Park, to finish fifth in the Copa de España standings, whilst in the main championship he finished in eighteenth place.

In May 2009, he made his debut in the Italian Formula Three Championship, driving for the Corbetta Competizioni team at the opening round of the series at Adria International Raceway. He took the final points-scoring position of tenth in race one before retiring from the second event.

In August 2009, Faccin made an appearance in the British Formula Three Championship round at Silverstone. Driving in the National Class for Team West-Tec, he finished the two races in eighteenth and twentieth places respectively, which equated to fourth place in the National Class on each occasion.

Other Series
In November 2009, Faccin tested a World Series by Renault car for the first time, driving for the Pons Racing team alongside Nelson Panciatici at the Circuit de Catalunya. Over the course of the two-day test, he completed a total of 174 laps, recording a best time of 1:35.949 on the final day.

Racing record

Career summary

References

External links
 Official website
 

1990 births
Living people
Italian racing drivers
Euroformula Open Championship drivers
British Formula Three Championship drivers
Italian Formula Three Championship drivers
Formula Renault Eurocup drivers
Italian Formula Renault 2.0 drivers
Formula Renault 2.0 Alps drivers
Eurocup Mégane Trophy drivers
Sportspeople from Padua
Superstars Series drivers
Team West-Tec drivers
Jenzer Motorsport drivers
Boutsen Ginion Racing drivers